Joseph E. Bogen, M.D. (July 13, 1926 – April 22, 2005) was a neurophysiologist who specialized in split brain research and focused on theories of consciousness. He was a clinical professor of neurosurgery at the University of Southern California, Adjunct Professor of Psychology at UCLA, and a visiting professor at Caltech.

Childhood, education and family
Joseph E. "Joe" Bogen was born on July 13, 1926, in Cincinnati, Ohio.

He was raised in Ohio, moved to Southern California at 16 and graduated from Monrovia High School, Monrovia, California in 1943. He began undergraduate studies at Caltech in 1943, but left to join the United States Navy in 1944. He was deployed to the South Pacific and was honorably discharged in 1946. He completed his undergraduate education at Whittier College and received a B.A. in Economics in 1949. He enrolled in the University of Cincinnati and UCLA, followed by the USC School of Medicine.

In 1955, he married the former Glenda A. Miksch, R.N. They had three children, a boy named Glenn David, who died in infancy, and two daughters, Meriel and Mira.

Dr. Bogen  received his M.D. from the University of Southern California in 1956. From 1956-57 he completed an internship in  Surgery at the New York Hospital Cornell, from 1957–58, he completed his residency in Surgery at that institution. From 1958-59, he was a Fellow in Medical Sciences at the  National Research Council. From 1959-63, he was a Resident in Neurosurgery,  at White Memorial Hospital. In 1966, he received his board certification and was a Diplomate, American Board of Neurological Surgery.

Split brain research
Bogen was part of a research team at Caltech with Roger Sperry and H. G. Gordon which conducted the first split brain study. His early surgical interventions to control epilepsy laid the foundation for the development of modern ideas about the unique identities of the right and left brains. His work played a crucial role in the development of the split-brain experiments that won Caltech's Roger Sperry the 1981 Nobel Prize in physiology.

Theories of consciousness
Bogen argued that consciousness is subjectivity, that looking for consciousness is like looking for the wind, you can only see its effects. Bogen suggested that scientists look for a center (a nucleus) that has distributivity (i.e. widespread inward and outward connectivity) as a site that produces subjectivity as consciousness.

At the time of his death, Bogen had been researching the site in the brain where consciousness is located and was preparing a book about his findings.

Bogen lent his expertise in Wernicke's area to American psychologist Julian Jaynes (1920–97), assisting Jaynes in the development of the bicameral mentality hypothesis in 1976.

Popular culture

Bogen is quoted in Philip K. Dick's 1977 novel, A Scanner Darkly.
The software development book, Python For Unix and Linux System Administration was dedicated to him, by a co-author whom he mentored.
Bogen is quoted in James T. de Kay's 1979 Graphic Novel, The Natural Superiority of The Left-Hander.

Publications
Voluminous list of books and journal articles:
1954-1987
1988-2005
Co-Author Bogen, Joseph and Glenda, De Zure, R., Tenhouten, W.D., a... THE OTHER SIDE OF THE BRAIN

References

External links
Joe Bogen's Caltech Homepage
Bogen's Curriculum Vitae
PBS Interviews
 https://www.closertotruth.com/roundtables/consciousness-definablehttps://www.closertotruth.com/roundtables/consciousness-definable

1926 births
2005 deaths
American cognitive neuroscientists
American consciousness researchers and theorists
Keck School of Medicine of USC alumni
Whittier College alumni